Telephone numbers in Angola are 9 digits long (except for special 1xx service numbers like Police and Emergency services), and must always be dialed in their entirety. Land-line (fixed-line) numbers start with digit 2, followed by 1 or 2 digits area code that corresponds to a geographic area. After the area code, there is the telecoms operator identifier, which consists of 1 digit, then the subscriber number. Mobile numbers have no geographic area, and they start with the operators identifier which currently are 91 and 92. (needs updating)

Calling formats
 xxx xxx xxx      Calls within Angola
 +244 xxx xxx xxx  Calls from outside Angola
The NSN length is nine digits.

List of area codes in Angola

References 

ITU allocations list

Angola
Telecommunications in Angola